The Georgian Mid Ontario Junior C Hockey League is a former Junior "C" ice hockey league in Ontario, Canada, sanctioned by the Ontario Hockey Association.  The Champion of the league competed for the All-Ontario Championship and the Clarence Schmalz Cup.

In the summer of 2016, the GMOHL merged into the Provincial Junior Hockey League and became the Carruthers Division in the Northern Conference.

History

Dating back to the late 1940s, the Georgian Bay League featured teams like the Owen Sound Greys, Barrie Colts, and Collingwood Blues.  As the top tier teams of the group were promoted to Junior B, teams to the north entered the loop in the 1960s - Powassan North Stars, Bracebridge Bears, Huntsville Blair McCann, Parry Sound Shamrocks, Gravenhurst Indians, and so on.  In 1971, the South-Central Junior D Hockey League was formed with teams like the Bradford Blues, Alliston Hornets, Schomberg Cougars, and Stayner Siskins.  The South-Central League became Central League Group 1 in 1973.  In 1974, Powassan and the Sundridge Beavers dropped out of the Georgian Bay League, so Huntsville and Bracebridge joined the Central League for two seasons until 1977 when they found enough interest from other clubs to restart their League.  During this time, the Central League had three playoff championships, Central Junior C, Georgian Bay Junior C, and Central Junior D, all representing the league at the provincial level.

When the South-Central Junior D league was promoted to Junior C, their league champion competed for the Clarence Schmalz Cup, but a second tier champion also competed for the Junior D OHA Cup.  In 1974, 1975, 1976, and 1977, the Stayner Siskins competed on behalf of the then Central league for the All-Ontario Junior D title, victorious in 1974 and 1976.

The Georgian Mid-Ontario Junior "C" Hockey League is the result of the 1994 merger of the Mid-Ontario Junior "C" Hockey League and the short-lived Georgian Junior "C" Hockey League.  The league began as a Junior "D" league in the early 1970s.

During the 2004-05 season, the GMOHL played an interlocking schedule with the Western Junior C Hockey League.  The GMOHL won the series with 44 victories, 32 losses, and 6 ties.

In, May 2010, The OHA confirmed the welcoming of The Caledon Golden Hawks have entered the GMOHL.  In March 2012, the GMOHL allowed the Huntsville Otters to join the league after recently retracting from the Ontario Junior Hockey League.  With the announcement on April 16, 2015 the league accepted the Collingwood Admirals as the eleventh franchise to the Georgian Bay Mid-Ontario Hockey League. The awarding of the Collingwood franchise was challenged by the Stayner Siskins on the basis that the area did not have enough hockey players to  support another franchise.  Their appeal was upheld and the expansion Admirals will not participate. The Fergus Devil's announced that they are taking a leave of absence for the 2015-16 season.

League timeline
Black vertical lines denote a Clarence Schmalz Cup championship.  Purple vertical lines denote an OHA Cup Jr. D championship.

The teams

 - inactive for the 2015-16 season.

2015-16 Playoffs
Winner moves on to the Clarence Schmalz Cup.

GMO Junior "C" Champions

Georgian Bay Champions

Mid-Ontario Champions

Central League (1973-1976)

Georgian Bay Junior C

South-Central Junior D

Regular season champions

Former member teams
Astorville Flyers, GB 1970s
Bradford Bulls, GMO 1971-06
Bracebridge Bears, GB 1974-78
Caledon Flyers, MO 1976-90
Collingwood Glassmen, MO 1977-79
Essa 80's, MO 1980-82, GB 1983-85
Innisfil Bruins, GB 1985-94
Grand Valley Harvesters, GMO 1993-96
Gravenhurst Cubs, GMO 1994-00
Gravenhurst Indians, GB 1980-87
Huntsville Blair McCann/Huskies, GB 1983-94
Keswick Royals, MO 1982-86
Meaford Monarchs, MO 1975-78
Orangeville Crushers, MO 1975-94
Oro 77's, GB 1977-92
Parry Sound Shamrocks, GB 1983-91
Powassan North Stars, GB 1970s
Shelburne Bluebirds, MO 1971-73
Sundridge Beavers, GB 1970s
Vaughan Kings/Maple Trappers, MO 1978-81
Wasaga Beach White Caps, GB 1992-93
Woodbridge Raiders, MO 1982-84

Professional alumni
National Hockey League
Perry Anderson (Alliston 1977-78)
Jason Arnott (Stayner 1989-90)
Mike Fountain (Huntsville 1988-89)
Kris King (Gravenhurst 1982-83)
Manny Legace (Alliston 1987-88)
John Madden (Alliston 1989-91)
Darrin Madeley (Bradford 1984-86)
Sandy McCarthy (Midland 1987-88)
Brian McReynolds (Penetang 1982-84)
Darrin Shannon (Alliston 1984-85)
Darryl Shannon (Alliston 1983-84)
Jeff Shevalier (Acton 1989-91)

References

External links
OHA Website

C
C
Sports leagues established in 1994
1994 establishments in Ontario